Bharatiya Janata Party secured absolute majority in  2014  Haryana assembly election. Manohar Lal Khattar was elected leader of the party in the assembly and was sworn in as chief minister of Haryana in October 2014. Here is the list of the ministers:

Council of Ministers

|}

Ministers of state

|}

See also
 Second Manohar Lal Khattar ministry

References

Khattar 01
Bharatiya Janata Party state ministries
2014 in Indian politics
2014 establishments in Haryana
2019 disestablishments in India
Cabinets established in 2014
Cabinets disestablished in 2019